The Union of Bulgarians in Transnistria, also calling itself the Historical and Human Rights Center of Bulgaria, is a non-governmental organization based in Transnistria whose leader is Alene Nikolayev, an ethnic Bulgarian born in Transnistria. The union is composed of ethnic Bulgarians. Of the 35 nationalities represented in Transnistria, ethnic Bulgarians represent less than 2 percent.

See also
 Alene Nikolayev
 Union of Moldovans in Transnistria
 Union of Russian Communities in Transnistria
 Union of Ukrainians in Transnistria

References

External links 
 Official website
 
Politics of Transnistria
Political organizations based in Transnistria
Organizations based in Transnistria
Bessarabian Bulgarians